Watsonian may refer to:

Watsonian Squire, an historic brand name of sidecar for motorcycles 
List of people educated at George Watson's College, former pupils of George Watson's College in Edinburgh, known in some circles at "Watsonians"
Dr. Watson, a character in the Sherlock Holmes stories by Sir Arthur Conan Doyle